Chushan station is a railway station on the Alishan Forest Railway line located in Alishan Township, Chiayi County, Taiwan..

History
Chushan station was opened on 13 January 1986 as the second station and terminus of a newly constructed 3 kilometers (approx) long branch line off the then Alishan  Zhaoping  Mianyue line ( which actually ran through to Shishou railway station). The old line from the junction up through Mianyue has been subsequently closed due to damage caused by the 1999 Jiji earthquake, leaving the Chushan service as the only line operating east of Zhaoping railway station.
That 3 Kilometer branch from the new junction to Chushan was first Taiwanese built section of mountain railway, all the other lines being built during the period when Japan controlled Taiwan.
At an elevation of 2451 meters above sea level, Chushan Station has the highest altitude of any railway station currently operating in Taiwan.
The  branch line and the two new stations, ( the other station being Duigaoyue railway station ), were constructed to handle increased tourist traffic visiting to watch the sunrise from nearby viewing platforms. This increase in visitors resulted from the improved access  provided by the opening of the Alishan Highway 台18線 and 台21線 into the Alishan National Forest Recreation Area.
Trains run to Chushan from Alishan railway station via Zhaoping, a journey of 6.25 kilometers.

Current

Chushan station is currently closed for rebuilding - from 14 October 2020 expected to reopen March 2022. 

The station is being modernised and increased in capacity to cope with the increased numbers of visitor.

Around the station
 Zhushan Observation Platform
 Ogasawara Mountain Observation Deck

See also
 List of railway stations in Taiwan

References 

1986 establishments in Taiwan
Alishan Forest Railway stations
Railway stations in Chiayi County
Railway stations opened in 1986